Vojvodina League West was a section of the Serbian Zone Leagues, Serbia's fourth football league. The league was operated by the Football Association of Vojvodina.

Vojvodina League West consisted of 16 clubs from West Bačka District, South Bačka District and Syrmia District who play each other in a double round-robin league, with each club playing the other club home and away. At the end of the season the top club was promoted to Serbian League Vojvodina, while second placed team in this group faced second team Vojvodina League East side for a two-legged play-off. The winner on aggregate score after both matches will earn a spot in the Serbian League Vojvodina.

The league after 2013–14 season was a replaced with Bačka Zone League and Novi Sad-Syrmia Zone League.

Champions history

References
Vojvođanska liga "Zapad", SrbijaSport.net

See also
Serbia national football team
Serbian Superliga
Serbian First League
Serbian League
Serbian Zone League

Defunct football leagues in Serbia
Football in Vojvodina
Vo